Don Budge defeated Gottfried von Cramm 6–1, 7–9, 6–1, 3–6, 6–1 in the final to win the men's singles tennis title at the 1937 U.S. National Championships.

Seeds
The tournament used two lists of eight players for seeding the men's singles event; one for U.S. players and one for foreign players. Don Budge is the champion; others show the round in which they were eliminated.

U.S.

  Don Budge (champion)
  Bobby Riggs (semifinals)
  Frank Parker (semifinals)
  Bryan Grant (quarterfinals)
  Joe Hunt (quarterfinals)
  Hal Surface (fourth round)
  John McDiarmid (third round)
  John Van Ryn (quarterfinals)

Foreign
  Gottfried von Cramm (finalist)
  Henner Henkel (second round)
  Jiro Yamagishi (fourth round)
  Charles Hare (quarterfinals)
  Yvon Petra (fourth round)
  Fumiteru Nakano (fourth round)
  Hideo Nishimura (second round)
  Jacques Brugnon (second round)

Draw

Key
 Q = Qualifier
 WC = Wild card
 LL = Lucky loser
 r = Retired

Finals

Earlier rounds

Section 1

Section 2

Section 3

Section 4

Section 5

Section 6

Section 7

Section 8

References

External links
 1937 U.S. National Championships on ITFtennis.com, the source for this draw

Men's Singles
1937